Terrel Bernard (born May 7, 1999) is an American football linebacker for the Buffalo Bills of the National Football League (NFL). He played college football at Baylor.

Early life and high school
Bernard grew up in La Porte, Texas and attended La Porte High School.

College career
Bernard redshirted his true freshman season at Baylor. He played in 11 games as a redshirt freshman and recorded 47 tackles with one sack and one interception. Bernard became a starter as a redshirt sophomore and was named second team All-Big 12 Conference after leading the Bears with 112 tackles and also recording 4.5 sacks, three fumble recoveries, and one interception. He repeated as a second team All-Big 12 selection in 2020 after recording 55 tackles through five games before suffering a season ending injury. Bernard was named first team All-Conference as a redshirt senior after recording 106 tackles with 12.5 for loss and 7.5 sacks.

Professional career

The Buffalo Bills selected Bernard in the third round, 89th overall, of the 2022 NFL Draft.

NFL career statistics

Regular season

Postseason

References

External links
 Buffalo Bills bio
Baylor Bears bio

Living people
Players of American football from Texas
American football linebackers
Baylor Bears football players
Sportspeople from Harris County, Texas
La Porte High School (Texas) alumni
Buffalo Bills players
1999 births
People from La Porte, Texas